Pieranie  is a village in the administrative district of Gmina Dąbrowa Biskupia, within Inowrocław County, Kuyavian-Pomeranian Voivodeship, in north-central Poland.

The village has a population of 190.

References

Pieranie